Ust-Tsilma Airport  is an airport in the Komi Republic, Russia, located  east of the rural locality of Ust-Tsilma in Ust-Tsilemsky District. Small transport aircraft are serviced. The facility arrangement uses a bare-bones utilitarian layout.

Airlines and destinations

References

Airports built in the Soviet Union
Airports in the Komi Republic